Thrigmopoeus is a genus of Indian tarantulas that was first described by Reginald Innes Pocock in 1899.  it contains two species, found in India: T. insignis and T. truculentus.

See also
 List of Theraphosidae species

References

Theraphosidae genera
Spiders of the Indian subcontinent
Taxa named by R. I. Pocock
Theraphosidae